Vali or Wali can refer to:

Places
Vali, India, a village in Khuzestan Province, Iran
Vali, East Azerbaijan, a village in East Azerbaijan Province, Iran

People
Wāli, title meaning governor in Arabic and several other languages 
The Vali tribe, a Sarmatian tribe of Ptolemy

Mythological characters
Váli, In Norse mythology, a son of Odin and Rind
Váli (son of Loki), a son of Loki in some versions of Norse mythology
Vali (Ramayana) or Bali, character in the Hindu epic Ramayana
Al-Walee, one of the Names of God in the Qur'an

Persons
Abbas Vali (born 1949), Iranian Kurdish academic
Ali Khan Vali (1845/46–1902), Iranian photographer and governor
Amir Vali (fl. 1356–1384), ruler of Astarabad and parts of Mazandaran 
Ayub Vali (born 1987), Iranian footballer
Baba Hyder Vali of Mulbagal (12th century), Indian Sufi saint 
Carmen L. Vali (born 1965), American politician, mayor of Aliso Viejo, California
Ferenc A. Váli (1905–1984), Hungarian-born lawyer, author and political analyst
Mastan Vali, Indian politician from Guntur West, Andhra Pradesh
Nathar Vali (died 1069), Iranian Sufi saint of India
Pourya-ye Vali (died 1322), Iranian Sufi and champion
Rajka Vali (1924–2011), Croatian pop music singer
Reza Vali (born 1952), Iranian musician and composer
Shah Nematollah Vali (1330–1431), Sufi master and poet 
Tawakkal Mastan Vali (17th century), Indian Sufi saint 
Voldemar Väli (1903–1997), Estonian Greco-Roman wrestler
Vaali (poet) (1931–2013), Indian poet and lyricist in Tamil

Film
Vali (film) or The Governor, a 2009 Turkish action film directed by M. Çağatay Tosun
Vaali (film), a 1999 Indian Tamil-language action film by S. J. Surya, starring Ajith Kumar

Medical
 ventilator-associated lung injury
 Vaping-associated lung injury, an acute lung injury due to certain vaping products

See also

 
 
Valis (disambiguation)
Valli (disambiguation)
Vaali (disambiguation)